Charulata (Spelt as Cārulatā) is a 1964 Indian drama film written and directed by Satyajit Ray. Based upon the novel Nastanirh by Rabindranath Tagore, it stars Soumitra Chatterjee, Madhabi Mukherjee and Sailen Mukherjee. The film is considered one of the finest works of Ray.

Both the first and the last scenes are critically acclaimed. The first scene, with almost no dialogue, shows Charu's loneliness and how she looks at the outside world through binoculars. In the last scene when Charu and her husband are about to come closer and hold their hands, the screen freezes. This has been described as a beautiful use of freeze frames in cinema.

Plot
Charulata is based on the story "Nastanirh (The Broken Nest)" by Rabindranath Tagore, set in Calcutta in 1879 (Ray sets the film in 1897). The Bengali Renaissance is at its peak, and India is under British rule. The film revolves around Charulata (Madhabi Mukherjee), the intelligent and beautiful wife of Bhupati (Sailen Mukherjee). He edits and publishes a political newspaper. Bhupati is an upper-class Bengali intellectual with a keen interest in politics and the freedom movement.

Charu is interested in the arts, literature and poetry. Although Bhupati loves his wife, he has no time for her. She has little to do in the house run by a fleet of servants. Sensing her boredom, Bhupati invites Charu's elder brother Umapada and his wife Manda to live with them. Umapada helps in running the magazine and the printing press. Manda, with her silly and crude ways, is no company for the sensitive, intelligent Charulata.

Amal (Soumitra Chatterjee), Bhupati's younger cousin, comes to visit. Bhupati asks him to encourage Charu's cultural interests. Amal is young and handsome, and he is in the same age group as Charu. He has literary ambitions and shares her interests in poetry. He provides her with much-needed intellectual companionship and attention. An intimate and teasing friendship develops between Charulata and Amal. There is a hint of rivalry when she publishes a short story on her own without his knowledge, following his publishing of a poem that she had forbidden him from getting published. He realizes that Charulata is in love with him, but he is reluctant to reciprocate due to the guilt involved.

Meanwhile, Charu's brother and sister-in-law swindle Bhupati of his money and run away. It destroys Bhupati's newspaper and the press. The episode shatters Bhupati who admits his hurt to Amal. He tells Amal that now Amal is the only one he can trust.

Amal is overcome with the guilt of betraying his cousin. He is also uncomfortable with Charu's higher intellect that he has helped nurture. He leaves unannounced. He leaves behind a letter to Bhupati and forbids Charu to stop writing.

Charu is heartbroken but hides her disappointment. Bhupati accidentally enters her room and finds her crying over Amal. Bhupati realizes Charu's feelings for Amal. He is broken, shocked and bewildered.

He rushes out of the house and wanders aimlessly in his carriage. On his return, Charu and Bhupati make a hesitant gesture to reach out, but their extended hands remain frozen in a tentative gesture.

Cast
 Madhabi Mukherjee - Charulata
 Soumitra Chatterjee - Amal
 Shailen Mukherjee - Bhupati Dutta
 Shyamal Ghoshal - Umapada
 Gitali Roy - Manda
 Bholanath Koyal - Braja
 Suku Mukherjee - Nishikanta
 Dilip Bose - Shashanka
 Joydeb - Nilotpal Dey
 Bankim Ghosh - Jagannath

Production
Charulata is based on the 1901 novella Nastanirh (The Broken Nest) by Bengali author Rabindranath Tagore. Ray later said that he liked the novella because "it has a western quality to it and the film obviously shares that quality. That's why I can speak of Mozart in connection with Charulata quite validly." Ray decided to set the film in 1897 instead of 1901 and spent many months researching the historical background. For the first time in his career he worked without a deadline both during pre-production and during the shooting. Ray worked closely with art director Bansi Chandragupta and no interior scene was shot on location. All sets were either built or remodelled to accurately portray India in the 1880s. Ray once called Charulata his favourite of his films.

Reception
Charulata holds one of the higher ratings for an Indian film in Rotten Tomatoes, a 96% rating based on 26 reviews with an average rating of 9.2/10. It has been widely regarded as one of the great films made in Indian cinema history and has won wide critical acclaim overseas as well.

In Sight and Sound, Penelope Houston praised the film, stating that "the interplay of sophistication and simplicity is extraordinary". A review in The New York Times stated the film "moved like a majestic snail, as do all Ray films". In 1965, The Times of London remarked that the film's depiction of values seemed influenced by the English, stating that "this stratum of Indian life was more English than England". Peter Bradshaw of The Guardian called the film "extraordinarily vivid and fresh." In 1992 Sight & Sound Critics' Poll of Greatest Films of All Time Charulata received 4 votes. The film ranked 6th in the British Film Institute's critics' poll and 7th in its user poll of "Top 10 Indian Films" of all time in 2002.

Much to Ray's dismay, the film was rejected at Cannes, a move protested by the likes of David Lean and Ingmar Bergman. The film was, supposedly, an all-time favourite of Jean-Luc Godard.

It was shown as part of the Cannes Classics section of the 2013 Cannes Film Festival. It was awarded Best Director by the Berlin Film Festival.

On the occasion of the birth centenary of Ray, senior journalist B.M. Hanif of Prajavani newspaper reported on 21 May 2020 that speculations were rife at the time of release that the story was based on the life of Rabindranath Tagore, his brother Jyotirindranath Tagore (who was 12 years elder to him) and his sister-in-law Kadambari Devi (who was two years elder to him) considering the fact that the story takes place in 1879-1880 when Rabindranath was 19 years old and that Kadambari Devi committed suicide four months after Rabindranath was married at the age of 23 in 1883 to the 9 or 11-year-old Mrinalini Devi.

Preservation
The Academy Film Archive preserved Charulata in 1996.

Awards

Tribute

The film contains a famous scene in which Charu (Madhabi Mukherjee) sings Rabindranath Tagore's song "Fule Fule Dhole Dhole" on a swing while looking at Amal (Soumitra Chatterjee). The scene is referenced in the Bollywood film Parineeta during the song sequence, Soona Man Ka Aangan. Indeed, Parineetas Lalita (Vidya Balan) is dressed to resemble Nastanirh/Charulatas Charu. Furthermore, Parineeta is based upon the novel Parineeta by Sarat Chandra Chattopadhyay who was a noted contemporary of Tagore (and who wrote novels concerned with social reform).

Home media
In 2013, The Criterion Collection released a restored high-definition digital transfer and new subtitle translations.

In the United Kingdom, it was 2013's ninth most-watched foreign-language film on television, with 113,600 viewers on Channel 4.

References

Further reading
 Antani, Jay.  "Charulata review." Slant Magazine, April 2004.
 Biswas, Moinak. "Writing on the Screen: Satyajit Ray’s Adaptation of Tagore"
 Chaudhuri, Neel. "Charulata: The Intimacies of a Broken Nest"
 Cooper, Darius.The Cinema of Satyajit Ray:Between Tradition and Modernity Cambridge University Press, 2000.
 Nyce, Ben. Satyajit Ray : A Study of His Films. New York: Praeger, 1988
 Seely, Clinton B. "Translating Between Media: Rabindranath Tagore and Satyajit Ray"
 Sen, Kaustav "Our Culture, Their Culture:Indian-ness in Satyajit Ray and Rabindranath Tagore explored through their works Charulata and Nashtanir"

External links
 Official website
 
 
 Charulata: “Calm Without, Fire Within” an essay by Philip Kemp at the Criterion Collection

1964 films
Films directed by Satyajit Ray
Bengali-language Indian films
Films set in Kolkata
Films based on works by Rabindranath Tagore
Films based on Indian novels
1964 drama films
Indian black-and-white films
Films about women in India
Memorials to Rabindranath Tagore
Best Feature Film National Film Award winners
Films with screenplays by Satyajit Ray
Films set in the 1870s
Films about writers
1960s Bengali-language films
Films scored by Satyajit Ray